The 1965 Sam Houston State Bearkats football team represented Sam Houston State College (now known as Sam Houston State University) as a member of the Lone Star Conference (LSC) during the 1965 NAIA football season. Led by 14th-year head coach Paul Pierce, the Bearkats compiled an overall record of 4–6 with a mark of 1–5 in conference play, and finished sixth in the LSC.

Schedule

References

Sam Houston State
Sam Houston Bearkats football seasons
Sam Houston State Bearkats football